Chiri Yaku (Quechua chiri cold, yaku water, "cold water", also spelled Chiriyacu) is a waterfall in the Junín Region of Peru.

References

Waterfalls of Peru
Landforms of Junín Region